Liga Betcris de Honduras (Honduran National Professional Football League) is the highest division of football in Honduras. The league season is divided into Opening (autumn) and Closing (spring). One team is relegated to the Liga de Ascenso (the team with fewest points in Opening and Closing) and one team is promoted from Liga de Ascenso. The top four clubs participate in play-offs to decide the champion. The winners of the Opening and Closing competitions participate in the CONCACAF Champions League.

History
In the 1930s, football experienced a surge in popularity in the country. In 1948 with the birth of the Francisco Morazán Major Football League, the idea to organize football began to take shape.

Olimpia, Federal, Motagua, Argentina and Real España are the pioneers of the Liga Mayor. In 1948 the first championship began in the recently inaugurated Estadio Tiburcio Carías Andino as Victoria were made champions by beating Motagua; and three years later, in 1951, they repeated the trick. Due to the high support the League received at this time, the Confederacy Sports School Extra of Honduras (F.N.D.E.H.) was founded.

The cancellation of the court of the Francisco Morazán Stadium of San Pedro Sula was the catalyst that caused the sport's leaders of the northern and central parts of Honduras to join forces and caused the disappearance of the F.N.D.E.H.

On 8 March 1951, Juan Manuel Galvez gave life to the F.N.D.E.H. when he signed the presidential decree I number 97 and he vouched for the execution of the first Sports Congress that was carried out in the installations of the abandoned "National Gymnasium Rubén Callejas Valentine".

 A decade after the creation of the F.N.D.E.H. and under the leadership of Hémerito F. Hernández, and also under Féderico Bunker Aguilar who had pioneered CONCACAF's creation at the same time, the idea to create the First National League of Football took shape between 1962 and 1963. Thanks in part to the aid of executives such as Alejandro Talbott that had studied in Mexico, the structure of that country's league was copied. On Saturday 3 and Sunday 4 April 1964 the 15th National Congress created the league. The 15th National Congress also started the National Non Amateur Football League of Honduras, LINAFUTH, that was founded 10 May, that year.

The president of the Sports Confederacy was Oscar Kafati and the secretary was journalist Andrés Torres Jr. Several teams sent delegates. These included Olimpia, Troya, España, Honduras de El Progreso, Vida, Marathón, Motagua, La Salle, and Atlético Español Glidden. 
Those delegates were chosen to be to the first Provisional board of directors that remained headed by: President Oscar Lara Mejía, Secretary: José T. Castañeda, Treasurer: Jesus J. Handal, Fiscal: Humberto Soriano Aguilar and vocal: Oscar Kirckonell, Alfredo Bueso, René Bendeck.

The first round of the first professional national championship was on 18 July 1965, with the following results: Olimpia 3–0 Marathón; España 1–0 Troya; Honduras 3–0 Atlético Español; Vida 4–1 Motagua; and Platense 6–2 La Salle. Jorge "Burro" Deras of Honduras Progreso was the first scorer of the league in the 5th minute against Atlético Español. Platense was the first professional champion of Honduras winning the two rounds; and Atlético Español finished last, but there was no relegation. Enrique Fúnez was the first top-scorer with 14 goals.

2022–23 teams

A total of 10 teams will contest the tournament, nine teams that participated in the 2021–22 season, since then Platense was relegated and Olancho FC went up to the first division.

Current format
Two tournaments per year with identical format, each crowning one champion:
 Apertura (Opening): from July to December
 Clausura (Closing): from January to May
10 clubs participating.  The League format consist of a round-robin tournament with each club playing each other twice.  The top six advance to the playoffs where the clubs ranked 3rd and 4th play in a home and away series against the clubs ranked 6th and 5th respectively.  The playoff winners advance to the semifinals and play against the clubs ranked 1st and 2nd.  The winners of the semifinals face in a double header to crown the champion.

Relegation and promotion 

Relegation is decided by the addition of both apertura and clausura tournament tables. The last team of the aggregated table is relegated to Liga de Ascenso de Honduras.
Promotion is decided in Liga de Ascenso de Honduras. Up to 2004 the champions were awarded automatic promotion. Since then, the season was divided into apertura and clausura, where champions face each other to decide promotion.

Records and statistics

Top scoring players

 As of 2018–19 Apertura
 Bold players are still active

Titles by year

Amateur era

Professional era

Titles by club

Professional era

Amateur and professional eras

International competitions

CONCACAF Champions' Cup / Champions League

Olimpia: 37 times (1962, 1967, 1968, 1970, 1971, 1972 Winners, 1973, 1976, 1983, 1985 Runners-up, 1987, 1988 Winners, 1989, 1990, 1994, 1996, 1997, 1998, 1999, 2000 Runners-up, 2002, 2005, 2006, 2007, 2008–09, 2009–10, 2010–11, 2011–12, 2012–13, 2013–14, 2014–15, 2015–16, 2016–17, 2018, 2020, 2021, 2023)

Motagua: 20 times (1969, 1971, 1974, 1975, 1977, 1983, 1986, 1991, 1992, 1993, 1995, 2003, 2008, 2010–11, 2011–12, 2015–16, 2018, 2020, 2022, 2023)

Real España: 17 times (1975, 1976, 1977, 1981, 1987, 1989, 1990, 1991, 1992, 1993, 1995, 1997, 2000, 2009–10, 2011–12, 2014–15, 2023)

Marathón: 11 times (1974, 1980, 1981, 1986, 1988, 2008–09, 2009–10, 2010–11, 2012–13, 2019, 2021)

Vida: 6 times (1963, 1972, 1973, 1982, 1984, 1985)

Universidad: 2 times (1980 Runners-up, 1984)

Victoria: 2 times (1996, 2013–14)

Petrotela: 1 time (1994)

Platense: 1 time (1998)

Honduras Progreso: 1 time (2016–17)

CONCACAF League

Olimpia: 5 times (2017 Winners, 2019, 2020, 2021, 2022)

Motagua: 5 times (2018 Runners-up, 2019 Runners-up, 2020, 2021 Runners-up, 2022)

Marathón: 3 times (2019, 2020, 2021)

Real España: 2 times (2018, 2022)

Honduras Progreso: 1 time (2017)

Platense: 1 time (2017)

Copa Fraternidad / Torneo Grandes de Centroamerica / UNCAF Interclub Cup (Defunct)

Olimpia: 13 times (1979, 1981 Winners, 1996 withdrew, 1997, 1998, 1999 Winners, 2000 Winners, 2001, 2003, 2004, 2005 Runners-up, 2006 Runners-up, 2007)

Motagua: 8 times (1979, 1996 withdrew, 1997, 1998, 1999, 2001, 2002, 2007 Winners)

Marathón: 7 times (1980, 1981, 1982, 2002, 2003, 2005, 2006)

Real España: 6 times (1981, 1982 Winners, 1998, 2000, 2004, 2007)

Vida: 2 times (1981, 1982)

Broncos: 1 time (1980 Winners)

Victoria: 1 time (2006)

CONCACAF Cup Winners Cup / Giants Cup (Defunct)

Olimpia: 2 times (1996 abandoned), (1997 abandoned)

Platense: 2 times (1997 abandoned), (1998 abandoned)

Real España: 1 time (1993 Runners-up)

Real Maya: 1 time (1994)

Marathón: 1 time (1995)

Motagua: 1 time (2001)

Copa Interamericana (Defunct)

Olimpia: 2 times (1972 Runners-up), (1988 Runners-up)

Copa Sudamericana

Motagua: 1 time (2008)

FIFA Club World Cup

Olimpia: 1 time (2001 canceled)

See also
 List of Honduran Liga Nacional top scorers
 Honduran Liga Nacional Reserves
 Honduran Liga Nacional de Ascenso
 Honduran Liga Mayor
 Honduran Amateur League
 Honduran Cup
 Honduran Supercup

References

External links
Official Website
League at fifa.com
Information on Honduran Futbol
More information on the league
Information on Honduras International and national league
Honduras - List of Champions, RSSSF.com

 
Liga Nacional
Honduras